Heatstroke is a severe heat illness.

Heatstroke may also refer to:

 Heatstroke (film), a 2008 film
 Heatstroke (song), a 2017 song by Calvin Harris
 Heat illness

See also
 Sunstroke (disambiguation)
 Sunstroke or heat illness, a spectrum of disorders due to environmental heat exposure